Hambaricho , at an elevation of 3058 meters above sea level, is one of the highest mountains in the Southern Nations, Nationalities and Peoples (SNNP) region of Ethiopia. It is located in Kambata (ከምባታ ዞን).
The mountain has a lot of historical, cultural, and spiritual significance to the local Kambata community. 
It is believed that the first seven kinship groupstribes of the Kambata lived on Mount Hambaricho from ancient times, and the Kambatas still refer to these groups as "Hambaricho Lamala" (ሀምበሪቾ ላማላ) (the seven kin-groups of Kambata) as the original/founding groups of the Kambata. As can be learned from historical sources based on oral traditions, people radiated from this historical center of Mount Hambaricho and began to settle around the mountain.

Due to its strategic location, Hambaricho and its mountain ranges served as the administrative seat for the kings of Kambata (known locally as Woma) until the last Woma of Kambata and his advisors were captured and executed  during the invasion and military occupation of Kambata by the armies of Menelik II from 1890 to 1893.  
After the conquest, the rule of the Woma was replaced by the rule of the Balabat, the local nobility until it lost importance after the Ethiopian civil war.However, Hambaricho continued to serve as  acenter for the Kambata people. After the conquest of Kambata Dejazmatch Bashah Aboye was "believed to have relocated his garrison" headquarters to Hambaricho. Tessema Darge, who led the conquest against Kambatta, had "lived at Hambaricho garrison and then relocated it into a new garrison in Angacha, Kambata." 

The Kambata people (ከምባቲ ምናደቡ) used to gather in Hambaricho annually to celebrate the Masala festival with gifata (patriotic and war songs) and shalla (cultural songs and dances) in the presence of the revered Abba Serecho (አባ ሰሬቾ), who was generally believed to have possessed immense Spiritual gift, spiritual power. Today, one can get a panoramic view of Hambaricho from Durame, an administrative center of Kambata Zone, and from other places in the Zone. The Kambata Zone administration has built 777 staircases that crisscross the mountain from the bottom to the summit in a large-scale project to make Hambaricho Mountain a tourist destination for local and international visitors. Kambata engineers managed the project from site survey and design to construction and completion of the stairs, demonstrating a great engineering performance. In the words of the Regional Centre for Mapping of Resources for Development (RCMRD) expert, Degalo Sendabo, the newly inaugurated Hambaricho Mountain staircase is "one of the best viewpoints to see the Great Rift Valley of Eastern Africa." The 777 stairs project, coupled with other ongoing Hambaricho Tourism and Green Development Projects (HT GDP), is part and parcel of making "the  historical center of Kambata people" one of the tourist destination centers in Southern Ethiopia.

References 

Mountains of Ethiopia